Juliano Francisco de Paula, known as Tuca, (born 9 August 1981) is a Brazilian footballer defender who played in Brazil, Bahrain and the United Arab Emirates. 

Tuca signed with Chapecoense in 2003, leaving to join Náutico in 2005. In November 2005 he played in a Campeonato Brasileiro Série B playoff match between Náutico Grêmio, which later became known as the Battle of Aflitos.

References

1981 births
Living people
Brazilian footballers
Sportspeople from Minas Gerais
Al-Muharraq SC players
Sport Club do Recife players
Clube Náutico Capibaribe players
Associação Chapecoense de Futebol players
Association football defenders